Reisserita is a genus of moths belonging to the family Tineidae.

All species are unicolourous, without any markings on the forewings.

Species
Reisserita arabica 	(Petersen, 1961) (Saudi Arabia)
Reisserita bettagi    Gaedike, 2009 (Moroccos)
Reisserita chalcopterella  (Zerny, 1935) (Moroccos)
Reisserita chrysopterella  (Herrich-Schäffer, 1854)
Reisserita cinnamomella Gaedike, 2015 (Moroccos)
Reisserita haasi  (Rebel, 1901)
Reisserita karsholti   Gaedike, 2009 (Moroccos)
Reisserita latiusculella   (Stainton, 1867) (Turkey, Lebanon, Israel, Cyprus) 
Reisserita leucella  (Turati, 1926)  (from Libya)
Reisserita luteopterella  Petersen, 1957  (Moroccos)
Reisserita mauritanica  (Baker, 1885)  (Algeria, Tunisia, Malta)
Reisserita meyi Gaedike, 2015 (Moroccos)
Reisserita oranella  (Petersen, 1957) 
Reisserita panormitanella  (Mann, 1859) (Algeria, Tunisia, Sicilia, Sardinia)
Reisserita parva  Petersen & Gaedike, 1979 (Moroccos, Spain)
Reisserita relicinella  Zeller, 1839
Reisserita stengeli   Gaedike, 2009 (Moroccos)
Reisserita zernyi  Petersen, 1957
Reisserita zouhari  Gaedike, 2009 (from Egypt)

Former species
Anomalotinea pseudoranella   (Petersen & Gaedike, 1979)

References

Reisserita on Markku Savela's ftp.funet.fi

Tineidae
Tineidae genera